New Force (FN) is an Italian neo-fascist political party.  It was founded by Roberto Fiore and Massimo Morsello. The party is a member of the Alliance for Peace and Freedom and was a part of the Social Alternative from 2003 to 2006. The party has often been strongly criticized for its radical positions and for acts of violence involving some militants. It was also the protagonist of political campaigns opposed to same-sex marriage and immigration to Italy.

History
New Force was formed within the Tricolour Flame (Fiamma Tricolore) and then began the process that led it to become a party. Its founders and financiers were two well-known names from the years of militancy in the lead for the movements of the Roman radical right, and for their neo-fascist political beliefs. The split occurred when Tricolour Flame of Pino Rauti began to oppose the distribution among its members of the bulletin of Roberto Fiore and Massimo Morsello.

In 1980, Fiore and Morsello escaped to London as fugitives after arrest warrants aimed at shedding light on the facts of the massacre at the Bologna railway station. The two were considered unrelated to the massacre, although they belonged, according to the judiciary, to the Nuclei Armati Rivoluzionari. They both stayed in England during the first government led by Margaret Thatcher with the status of political refugees for 20 years.

New Force was founded on 29 September 1997 at a meeting in Cave, in the province of Lazio, organized by Francesco Pallottino, leader of a Nazi rock group. It was not a random date because it is the one dedicated to St. Michael the Archangel, a symbol among other things of the Romanian Iron Guard, to which Forza Nuova historically refers. The founders Fiore and Morsello were still fugitives in London and did not return until 1999. Fiore was sentenced by a court to 66 months in prison. Morsello was sentenced to 98 months, although he did not serve them as he was dying from cancer (he died in March 2001).

The national launch of the group was in Latina with a conference in April 1998. Forza Nuova was placed on the political scene with the goal at the local level, to broaden their contacts on concrete campaigns against immigration, abortion, crime, and to hold together the conservative right-wing traditionalist with the social channel blocker.

On 25 March 1999, Massimo Morsello returned to Italy, and so did Roberto Fiore on 21 April of the following year. They were welcomed at the airport by deputies of the National Alliance and Forza Italia such as Francesco Storace, Enzo Fragalà, Alberto Simeone, Carlo Taormina, Ernesto Caccavale and Teodoro Buontempo. In early 2001, the movement could count on 2500 members and forty sections scattered across Italy.

In 2001 general election, New Force gained 13,622 votes at the Chamber of Deputies.
In 2008 general election, the party won 0.30% in the Chamber and 0.26% in the Senate. It has not been elected a parliamentary presented himself in the lists of the party. Following the resignation of mandatory Alessandra Mussolini, elected to the Chamber of Deputies, Roberto Fiore became MEP.

In 2013 general election, New Force got 89,812 votes (0.26%) in the Chamber of Deputies and 81,521 votes in the Senate, failing to elect any candidate but becoming the largest far-right party in Italy.

In 2016, New Force was featured in an episode of Huang's World on the television channel Viceland. In the episode, the members went out to eat with Eddie Huang, the host, and an apparent local Sicilian walked by and happened to recognize the politicians and yelled at them for their far-right views. It ends with the host and camera crew going to jail because, they claimed, the New Force members had them arrested by the police.

For the 2018 general election New Force joined with Tricolour Flame to form the Italy for the Italians coalition.

In May 2020 an internal party split takes place, dozens of offices throughout Italy leave the party giving life to a new entity called National Movement – The Network of the Patriots in controversy with the management of Fiore and Castellino considered not very transparent and too close to Matteo Salvini as well as aiming exclusively at obtaining media hype. The new political entity is officially founded on 10 October 2020. 

On 9 October 2021 New Force militants attacked the headquarters of the CGIL labour union during a protest march against vaccine passports. Party founder and national secretary Roberto Fiore, the chief of the Roman chapter of the party Giuliano Castellino, the former NAR terrorist Luigi Aronica and other party members were arrested in the aftermath of the attack.

On 11 October the Public Prosecutor's Office at the Court of Rome imposed a block on the party's site.

Presence outside Italy
Forza Nuova has longstanding ties to other European far-right organization, including the British National Party. Forza Nuova leader Roberto Fiore was once closely allied with the Ukrainian far-right Svoboda party, but following the beginning of the Russo-Ukrainian War, Forza Nuova and Fiore "made a considerable shift to the pro-Russian camp." According to the Political Capital Institute, a Hungarian think tank, Forza Nuova is one of a number of Russian-backed radical right political parties in Europe.

In 2016, a Forza Nuova affiliate continued attempts to recruit members in the United States. The group established Forza Nuova—USA chapters in New Jersey (Forza Nuova—USA's headquarters) and Phoenix, Arizona.

In 2018, Forza Nuova joined forces with Polish ultra-right organization National Radical Camp to "patrol" the beaches of Italian Romagna Riviera.

Political platform

The political movement claims to aim for "national reconstruction" by achieving eleven objectives:

 The repeal of abortion law.
 A social policy that encourages population growth and the traditional family.
 Opposition to immigration and the humane repatriation of recent immigrants to Italy.
 The fight against the Mafia, the banning of Freemasonry and all secret societies, together with exit from NATO and removal from the U.S. sphere of influence.
 The fight against usury and writing off of public debt, as well as the abolition of capitalism.
 The restoration of the 1929 agreement between the State and the Church and the defence of national identity.
 The repeal of the Mancino and Scelba laws, which the Forza Nuova believes destroy freedom.
 The formation of guilds for the protection of workers.
 Laws to eliminate seigniorage banking income and for the state to issue currency; complementary currencies for local trade, and the nationalization of the following sectors: health, the central bank, commercial banks and strategic industries
 The "recovery of Christian religiosity" and of "faith in the Catholic Church".

New Force is also characterized by Euroscepticism; Roberto Fiore, FN leader, stated that he wanted to oppose  "with all possible legal means" the entry into force of the Lisbon Treaty.

Election results

Italian Parliament

European Parliament

Symbols

Notes

External links

Euronat members
Political parties established in 1997
Neo-fascist organisations in Italy
1997 establishments in Italy
Catholic political parties
Neo-fascist parties
Nationalist parties in Italy
Eurosceptic parties in Italy
Far-right parties in Europe